Antonio may refer to:

 Antonio, a masculine given name of Etruscan origin deriving from the root name Antonius
 Antonio (dancer), a Spanish flamenco dancer, choreographer and dance director
 Antonio (horse), was a British Thoroughbred racehorse and sire
 Antonio (singer), a United Kingdom-based Jamaican reggae singer
 Antonio (The Merchant of Venice), the title character in Shakespeare's The Merchant of Venice.
 Antonio (play), an 1800 play by William Godwin

See also

Sant'Antonio (disambiguation)
San Antonio (disambiguation)
Santo Antonio (disambiguation)
Anthony (disambiguation)